Jan Długosz (1 December 1415 – 19 May 1480), also known in Latin as Johannes Longinus, was a Polish priest, chronicler, diplomat, soldier, and secretary to Bishop Zbigniew Oleśnicki of Kraków. He is considered Poland's first historian.

Life

Jan Długosz is best known for his  (Annales seu cronici incliti regni Poloniae) in 12 volumes and originally written in Latin, covering events in southeastern Europe, but also in Western Europe, from 965 to 1480, the year he died. Długosz combined features of Medieval chronicles with elements of humanistic historiography. For writing the history of the Kingdom of Poland, Długosz also used Ruthenian (Russian) chronicles including those that did not survive to our times (among which there could have been used the Kyiv collection of chronicles of the 11th century in the Przemysl's edition around 1100 and the Przemysl episcopal collections of 1225–40).

His work was first printed in 1701–1703. It was originally printed at the Jan Szeliga printing house in Dobromyl financed by Jan Szczęsny Herburt. Whenever Jan Długosz bothers to mention himself in the book, he writes of himself in the third person. He belonged to the Wieniawa coat-of-arms.

Długosz was a canon at Kraków, educated at the University of Krakow. He was sent by King Casimir IV Jagiellon of Poland on diplomatic missions to the Papal and Imperial courts, and was involved in the King's negotiations with the Teutonic Knights during the Thirteen Years' War (1454–66) and at the peace negotiations.

In 1434, Długosz's uncle, the first pastor at Kłobuck, appointed him to take over his position as canon of St. Martin church there. The town was in the Opole territory of Silesia, but had recently been conquered by Władysław II Jagiełło. Długosz stayed until 1452 and while there, founded the canonical monastery.

In 1450, Długosz was sent by Queen Sophia of Halshany and King Casimir to conduct peace negotiations between John Hunyadi and the Bohemian noble Jan Jiskra of Brandýs, and after six days' of talks convinced them to sign a truce.

In 1455 in Kraków, a fire spread which destroyed much of the city and the castle, but which spared .

In 1461 a Polish delegation which included Długosz met with emissaries of George of Podebrady in Bytom, Silesia. After six days of talks, they concluded an alliance between the two factions. In 1466 Długosz was sent to the legate of Wrocław, in order to attempt to obtain assurance that the legate was not biased in favor of the Teutonic Knights. He was successful, and was in 1467 entrusted with tutoring the king's son.

Długosz declined the offer of the Archbishopric of Prague, but shortly before his death was nominated Archbishop of Lwów.  This nomination was only confirmed by Pope Sixtus IV on 2 June 1480, two weeks after his death.

His work Banderia Prutenorum of 1448 is his description of the 1410 Battle of Grunwald, which took place between villages of Grunwald and Stębark.

At some point in his life Długosz loosely translated Wigand of Marburg's Chronica nova Prutenica from Middle High German into Latin, however with many mistakes and mixup of names and places.

Works

 Liber beneficiorum dioecesis Cracoviensis
Annales seu cronicae incliti Regni Poloniae (Annals or Chronicles of the Famous Kingdom of Poland)
Roczniki, czyli kroniki sławnego Królestwa Polskiego (new Polish translation of the Annals, 1961–2006)
The Annals of Jan Dlugosz (English translation of key sections of the work)

Historiae Polonicae libri xii (Polish Histories, in Twelve Books; written 1455–80; first published 1711–12, in 2 volumes)
Banderia Prutenorum, flag book, completed in or shortly after 1448, when  painted the illuminations.

See also
Jan Długosz Award
History of Poland

References

External links
 Liber beneficiorum ecclesiae Cracoviensis ("Book of the Benefices of the Bishopric of Krakow") At the National Digital Library of Poland

1415 births
1480 deaths
15th-century Latin writers
15th-century Polish historians
15th-century Roman Catholic archbishops in Poland
Archbishops of Lviv
Canons of Kraków
People from Pajęczno County
Polish chroniclers
Polish heraldists
Polish male non-fiction writers
Jagiellonian University alumni